Slaughter Trail is a 1951 Cinecolor Western film produced and directed by Irving Allen, filmed in Corriganville and released by RKO Pictures.

Plot
A trio of masked bandits rob a stagecoach secretly assisted by one of the passengers. The fleeing bandits come across some unarmed Navajo who they shoot and steal their horses. One of the Navajo survives and informs the tribe who sets his tribe on the warpath against all whites. The commander of the US Cavalry fort who is friendly with the Navajo chief is caught in the middle.

Main cast
 Brian Donlevy as Capt. Dempster
 Gig Young as Ike Vaughn
 Virginia Grey as Lorabelle Larkin
 Andy Devine as Sgt. Macintosh
 Robert Hutton as Lt. Morgan
 Terry Gilkyson as Singalong

Production
The film was made in 1950 and was originally to have been released through Eagle-Lion but was picked up for release by RKO.

Originally the film was shot with Howard Da Silva in the lead. After he was accused of Communist leanings, RKO ordered DaSilva's scenes reshot with Brian Donlevy.
 
Allen reshot the film in three days and sold it to RKO for $200,000.

Like High Noon, Slaughter Trail has continuing ballads throughout the film that ask and answer questions as well as narrate the story.  It may be debated whether the film was made "straight," or was satiric, due to the even then well known Western set pieces such as a stagecoach holdup, Indian attacks, and the army standing between hostile Indians and townspeople being commented on by songs that often break the fourth wall. The writer of the film Sid Kuller was a well known comedy writer and also wrote some of the film's songs. One of the film's songs I Wish I Was became a hit song of the year.

Notes

External links
 

1951 films
1951 Western (genre) films
Films directed by Irving Allen
Western (genre) cavalry films
Cinecolor films
Films set in 1882
American Western (genre) films
1950s English-language films
1950s American films